Aftab Ahmed Gogi; born 6 May 1931) is a former Pakistani cricketer. He was born in Lahore. He was a right-arm off spin bowler and right-handed batsman.

Aftab made his first-class debut for Punjab University during the 1948–49 season against a Punjab Governor's XI, and played in a similar fixture two seasons later. He played for Punjab during the first two editions of the Quaid-e-Azam Trophy, in 1953–54 and 1954–55. His only other first-class appearance was for Punjab against the touring Indians in February 1955.

Aftab's first-class career best came against North-West Frontier Province in November 1954. He took a career-best 6/27 in the first innings and 5/52 in the second innings, finishing with match figures of 11/79.

References

1931 births
Living people
Pakistani cricketers
Punjab University cricketers
Cricketers from Lahore
Punjab (Pakistan) cricketers